Wierzbica  is a village in the administrative district of Gmina Ładzice, within Radomsko County, Łódź Voivodeship, in central Poland.

The village has a population of 530.

References

Villages in Radomsko County